Charles W. Walker Sr. (born November 8, 1947) is a former state senator in the legislature of the state of Georgia. He was first elected in 1990. In 1996, he became Georgia's first African-American Senate Majority Leader. Walker is a Democrat and is from Augusta, Georgia.

Walker owned a myriad of small enterprises under the name The Walker Group.  One of Walker's first ventures was a convenience store called "Reklaw's", which is Walker spelled backwards.

Walker started a newspaper called The Augusta Focus that served Augusta's black community.  It often expressed opposing viewpoints to Augusta's only daily newspaper, The Augusta Chronicle.

Convicted in 2005 by a federal court in Augusta on charges including tax evasion, mail fraud, theft, misusing campaign funds, and conspiracy (127 counts, in all), Walker was serving a ten-year sentence at a Federal Correctional Institution in Estill, South Carolina. His projected release date was September 26, 2022.

An appeal of his convictions was rejected on July 6, 2007.

Walker filed a petition for habeas corpus in March 2009. The federal judge who presided over his trial recused himself from presiding over Walker's petition in May 2009.

Walker was released from custody in late 2016.

References

1947 births
Living people
African-American state legislators in Georgia (U.S. state)
Democratic Party Georgia (U.S. state) state senators
Politicians convicted of mail and wire fraud
American people convicted of tax crimes
Georgia (U.S. state) politicians convicted of crimes
21st-century American politicians
Politicians from Augusta, Georgia
21st-century African-American politicians
20th-century African-American people